The Enterprise Public Library, located in Enterprise, Oregon, was constructed with a $5,000 grant from the Carnegie Corporation and completed in 1914. After being nominated by Oregon's State Advisory Committee on Historic Preservation in June 2013, it was added to the National Register of Historic Places.

See also
 National Register of Historic Places listings in Wallowa County, Oregon

References

1914 establishments in Oregon
Buildings and structures in Enterprise, Oregon
Carnegie libraries in Oregon
Libraries on the National Register of Historic Places in Oregon
Library buildings completed in 1914
National Register of Historic Places in Wallowa County, Oregon
Public libraries in Oregon